Jesús Colina (born 1969 in Miranda de Ebro) is a Spanish journalist who worked in Rome.  He led the Zenit News Agency, and currently directs the Aleteia newspaper.

In 1991 he was the editor of Proyección Mundial, then Catholic World Report and Le Temps de l'Eglise in France. From 1994, he has been correspondent in Rome for Alfa y Omega, weekly supplement of ABC Spanish newspaper. He wrote also for oAvvenire and National Catholic Register.

In 1997 founded Zenit News Agency, a catholic news agency. In 1998 worked at the Digital Network of the Church in Latin America, RIIAL. In 2011 he was dismissed from Zenit by the Legionaries to give the media a more institutional identity. In 2007, Pope Benedict XVI appointed him consultor to the Pontifical Council for Social Communications.

He started working on a new project and in 2011 he founded Aleteia, an online Catholic news and information website with the support of the Foundation for Evangelization through the Media. Is the current President and editorial director of Aleteia.

He has received the awards "Bravo!" in 2018 by the Spanish Bishops. Also received the Servitor Pacis Award in 2006 at the United Nations (UN) headquarters in New York for his professional contributions.

References 

1968 births
Editors of religious publications
Living people
Spanish journalists